was one of four s built for the Imperial Japanese Navy during World War II.

Background and description
The Japanese called these ships Kaibōkan, "ocean defence ships" (Kai = sea, ocean, Bo = defence, Kan = ship), to denote a multi-purpose vessel. They were initially intended for patrol and fishery protection, minesweeping and as convoy escorts.

The main armament of the Shimushu class consisted of three Type 3  guns in single mounts, one superfiring pair aft and one mount forward of the superstructure. They were built with four Type 96  anti-aircraft guns in two twin-gun mounts, but the total was increased to 15 guns by August 1943. A dozen depth charges were stowed aboard initially, but this was doubled in May 1942 when their minesweeping gear was removed. The anti-submarine weaponry later rose to 60 depth charges with a Type 97  trench mortar and six depth charge throwers.

Construction and career

Based in the Kuriles, she patrolled and escorted convoys and ships there. On 7 October 1943, Ishigaki sank the submarine . S-44 discovered a target on her radar that she took to be a lone small freighter. S-44 opened fire with her 4-inch deck gun on the refrigerator ship Koko Maru. Captain Francis Brown of S-44 ordered a crash dive, but Ishigaki scored her first hit on S-44s conning tower before she could submerge. S-44 attempted to fight back with her deck gun, but her gunners were blinded by Ishigakis  searchlight and she scored no hits. Ishigaki then scored her second hit on the submarine's battery section. She then turned and all three 4.7-inch guns began firing at S-44. Soon, she scored several more hits on S-44 which began to sink. Perhaps as many as eight men had made it off the submarine; but only Chief Torpedoman's Mate Ernest A. Duva and Radioman Third Class William F. Whitemore were picked up by Ishigaki, so Ishigakis captain could claim his success.

On 31 May 1944, Ishigaki was torpedoed by the submarine , and her bow was destroyed. She managed to drop several depth charges before sinking with a loss of 167 sailors.

Citations

General references

External links 
 http://www.combinedfleet.com/Ishigaki_t.htm

1940 ships
Maritime incidents in May 1944
Shimushu-class escort ships
Ships sunk by American submarines
World War II naval ships of Japan
World War II shipwrecks in the Pacific Ocean
Ships built by Mitsui Engineering and Shipbuilding